MIDI Show Control, or MSC, is a significant Real Time System Exclusive extension of the international Musical Instrument Digital Interface (MIDI) standard. MSC enables all types of entertainment equipment to easily communicate with each other through the process of show control.

The MIDI Show Control protocol is an industry standard ratified by the MIDI Manufacturers Association in 1991 which allows all types of entertainment control devices to talk with each other and with computers to perform show control functions in live and canned entertainment applications. Just like musical MIDI, MSC does not transmit the actual show media - it simply transmits digital information about a multimedia performance.

How MSC works 

When any cue is called by a user (typically a stage manager) and/or preprogrammed timeline in a show control software application, the show controller transmits one or more MSC messages from its 'MIDI Out' port. A typical MSC message sequence is:

 the user has just called a cue 
the cue is for lighting device 3
 the cue is number 45.8
the cue is in cue list 7

MSC messages are serially transmitted in the same way as musical messages and are fully compatible with all conventional MIDI hardware, however many modern MSC devices now use Ethernet communications for higher bandwidth and the flexibility afforded by networks. Other performance parameters are also transmitted such as lighting desk submaster settings using MSC SET messages.

All cues that a media control device is capable of playing are assigned MSC messages within the Show Controller's cue list and they are transmitted from its 'MIDI Out' port at the appropriate show time, depending on the actions of the user and the show controller's internally timed sequences.

All MSC compatible instruments follow the MSC specification and thus transmit identical MSC messages for identical MSC events such as the playing of a certain cue on the media controller. Since they follow a published standard, all MSC devices can communicate with and understand each other, as well as with computers which have been programmed to understand MSC messages using the MSC Command Set. All MSC compatible instruments have a built-in MIDI interface and many now follow one of the various MIDI-over-Ethernet protocols.

History 

To create the MSC spec, Charlie Richmond headed the USITT MIDI Forum on their Callboard Network in 1990, which included developers and designers from the theatre sound and lighting industry from around the world. It is believed that this was the first international standard to be developed without a single physical meeting of the participants and the full transcript of the discussion is available via External Links, below.  This Forum created the MSC standard between January and September, 1990.  This was ratified by the MIDI Manufacturers Association (MMA) in January 1991, and the Japan MIDI Standards Committee (JMSC) later that year, becoming a part of the standard MIDI specification in August, 1991.  The first show to fully use the MSC specification was the Magic Kingdom Parade at Walt Disney World's Magic Kingdom in September 1991.

MIDI Show Control software

See also
 Sound design
 Theatre lighting

References

External links 

 MIDI Manufacturers Association
 MSC 1.0 PDF (still a valid subset, is now superseded by V1.1) 
 The Show Control Mailing List subscription page.
 Creating the MIDI Show Control Spec on the USITT Callboard Forum in 1990-2

Computer file formats
Digital media
MIDI standards